José Ibáñez Martín (18 December 1896 in Valbona, Aragon – 21 December 1969 in Madrid) was a Spanish politician who was a long-serving member of the Cabinet of Francisco Franco. From 1939 to 1967 he also served as President of the Spanish National Research Council.

Biography
A supporter of Miguel Primo de Rivera, 2nd Marquis of Estella in his youth, Ibáñez Martín served as a deputy for the Spanish Confederation of the Autonomous Right (CEDA). He was a leading member of the Asociación Católica Nacional de Propagandistas (ANCP), the propaganda movement that formed the basis for the Catholic monarchist party Popular Action. Thrwoing his lot in with the Nationalist side in the Spanish Civil War, he became staunchly loyal to Francisco Franco, to the point where critics accused him of sycophancy, and he even compared Franco to Fernán González of Castile due to El Caudillo founding a "new Spain". However Ibáñez Martín spent most of the civil war out of the country as Franco had despatched him to Latin America with a mission to promote the Nationalist cause amongst the Spanish-speaking people there.

Appointed as Minister of Education in succession to Pedro Sainz Rodríguez in 1939, a post he held until 1951, Ibáñez Martín oversaw the dismantling of the republican education system and its replacement with one based largely on the values and ideas of the Roman Catholic Church. Highly reactionary in his Catholicism, Ibáñez Martín was impressed by Josemaría Escrivá and as Minister of Education in the early 1940s he ensured that members of Opus Dei would no longer be hindered in the efforts to obtain teaching posts at universities, a move that helped the organisation grow considerably in power. Although not a member of Opus Dei Ibáñez Martín felt a bond to the movement due to his close friendship with José María Albareda, the two having met during the civil war whilst sheltering in the Chilean embassy in Madrid.

He enjoyed a growth in influence in the immediate aftermath of the Second World War as Franco sought to trim his cabinet of anybody who had declared support for the Axis powers. As a result, Ibáñez Martín was given control over the press as well as retaining his role as Education Minister. His decision to rejoin to the ANCP in 1944, at the time somewhat controversial, had thus in fact helped his prospects as there had been little common ground between the monarchists and the pro-Nazi wings of Franco's movement.

Ibáñez Martín was the Spanish ambassador to Portugal from 1958 to 1969.

References

1896 births
1969 deaths
Education ministers of Spain
Spanish monarchists
Spanish Roman Catholics
Ambassadors of Spain to Portugal
Members of the Congress of Deputies of the Second Spanish Republic